Watford tube station is the terminus of a Metropolitan line branch line  in the north-western part of the London Underground in Zone 7. The station opened in 1925.

Location and description 

The station is in the Cassiobury area, on Cassiobury Park Avenue at the junction with Metropolitan Station Approach, close to two of the entrances to Cassiobury Park. The station building was designed by the Metropolitan Railway's architect Charles Walter Clark in an Arts and Crafts vernacular style. It is in red brick with a clay-tiled hipped roof, tall brick chimney stacks, and timber sash and casement windows. The main entrance is covered by a polygonal metal canopy supported by twin Doric columns, and the interior, mostly unaltered from the original, is decorated with period tiling and hardwood panelling. The station building is Grade II listed.

According to data compiled in 2010, it is the 25th-least used station on the London Underground.

History 

In the early 20th century, the Metropolitan Railway (MR) penetrated Hertfordshire and Buckinghamshire with its suburban railway, enticing Londoners with its "Metro-Land" advertising campaign promoting the new railway as an opportunity to live in a rural location with easy transport to central London. The MR was also intent on providing a connection from Watford and planned a branch line from  via . The MR purchased a swathe of land from Gonville and Caius College, Cambridge along the planned route, and Parliamentary approval for the branch was granted in 1912. The project was hampered by disagreements with the Watford Borough Council and by the outbreak of World War I in 1914, and construction of the  branch did not begin until 1922. The MR experienced difficulties running the line across the River Gade and the Grand Junction Canal, and this pushed costs up to £300,000.

The Watford Observer commented on the opening that the new station was "likely to have a much greater effect on the town than is at present realised. Just as trade follows the flag, so population follows the railway". Posters published by the MR in 1925 promoting the new route "by Metro to Watford" depicted Watford High Street on market day, belying the remote location of the station.

For many years, the MR operated a bus service from the High Street in an effort to gain more passengers, but contrary to the Watford Observer'''s predictions patronage remained low.

Watford tube station in Cassiobury Park Avenue was not originally planned to be the terminus of the Watford branch. The Metropolitan Railway Company's original plans drawn up in 1912 intended the line to continue through Cassiobury Park and beyond to Hempstead Road on an area known locally as 'The Wilderness', where West Herts College would later be built (opened in 1938).

Watford Council had recently bought part of the Cassiobury Estate and objected to the proposed railway through the town park and recreation gardens, and so the last section of the route was removed and the line would end abruptly in Cassiobury Park Avenue instead.

An opportunity arose in 1927 for another route to extend the line into the centre of Watford. Through a third party, the Metropolitan was able to purchase an existing building at 44 Watford High Street together with two-and-a-half acres of backlands, with the intention of creating a terminus in the town centre. The possibility of a single-track extension in tunnel—either from the existing station or following a diversionary route around the station—was explored, but costs were extremely high and no Parliamentary powers were sought. The High Street building was leased out and was eventually disposed of by London Transport in 1936, and today Watford station remains the terminus of the line, approximately one mile from the town centre.

When Travelcard zones were introduced in 1984 by London Regional Transport, the station was in Zone B; in 2004 it moved to Zone A, and in 2008 to Zone 7.

 Future 

The ambition to extend the Metropolitan line into Watford town centre was revived around 1994 by London Regional Transport (LRT) when proposals were put forward to run the line to Watford Junction. The projected route was shown on an adapted version of the Tube map for internal planning purposes printed in that year. The line, opened in 1912, had been closed by British Rail in 1996 owing to low passenger numbers. Although it ran very close to the Metropolitan line (at its closest point about 200 metres away), the two lines were never linked. The plan was to connect the two lines via a short viaduct. The Croxley Rail Link project would have resulted in the closure of Watford station.

On 14 December 2011 the project was given approval by the Department for Transport at an expected cost of £115.9 million with a proposed completion date of January 2016, later revised to 2020. The planned closure of Watford station met with some local opposition, and campaigners lobbied for the station to remain open with a reduced shuttle service. A report compiled in 2012 by the transport watchdog London TravelWatch concluded that the opening of new stations on the route would mitigate any inconvenience caused by the closure, and that a minority of passengers would experience an increase in journey times of more than 15 minutes. It also recommended that a shuttle train service should be trialled, and that in the event of closure a bus service should be provided from Cassiobury to one of the new stations.

On 25 January 2017, the Watford Observer'' newspaper published an update on the Croxley Rail Link confirming work had stopped as there was an ongoing funding issue.

Services 
 the typical off-peak service was four trains per hour to Baker Street, with a limited service to Aldgate at peak times.

See also 

 Croxley Rail Link
 Croxley tube station
 Watford Junction
 Watford High Street railway station

References

Bibliography

Metropolitan line stations
Tube stations in Hertfordshire
Former Metropolitan and Great Central Joint Railway stations
Railway stations in Great Britain opened in 1925
Charles Walter Clark railway stations
Grade II listed buildings in Hertfordshire